The Casa Roig Museum is a historic house museum and gallery in Humacao, Puerto Rico. It was designed as a residence for the wealthy sugar planter Antonio Roig by the prominent Czech architect and Puerto Rico resident Antonin Nechodoma (1877–1928), and built in 1920.

Description
Casa Roig was built in the Prairie School style in 1920. The house has a cruciform plant, has two floors and a basement. It is made of concrete and wood, decorated lavishly with stained glass and mosaics.  The design follows the Prairie House School style of the architect Louis Sullivan, but especially the unique style of the renowned American architect Frank Lloyd Wright (1867–1959).

The house was inhabited until 1956. From then on it remained closed until August 13, 1977, when the heirs of Antonio Roig donated the residence to the University of Puerto Rico who adopted the mission to restore and preserve the structure.  The work of restoration was carried out by the architects Otto Reyes and Tom Marvel over a period of 10 years. Casa Roig opened its doors to the public in 1989 and since then has served as a physical footprint and testimony of the Prairie School style adapted to the Caribbean, and as a center for cultural diffusion. Casa Roig is considered among the best works of Nechodoma, and is the only residential structure built by Nechodoma which still remains complete.

The house was listed on the U.S. National Register of Historic Places in 1977.

The museum's roof sustained damages when Hurricane Maria struck Puerto Rico in September, 2017.

Gallery

See also
 National Register of Historic Places listings in eastern Puerto Rico

References

External links

  
 
 Article about Casa Roig

Historic house museums in Puerto Rico
Art museums and galleries in Puerto Rico
Contemporary art galleries in the United States
Museums in Humacao, Puerto Rico
University museums in Puerto Rico
Houses completed in 1920
Roig Museum
Prairie School architecture in the United States
University of Puerto Rico
University and college buildings on the National Register of Historic Places in Puerto Rico
1920 establishments in Puerto Rico
Museums established in 1989
1989 establishments in Puerto Rico
National Register of Historic Places in Humacao, Puerto Rico